Ciak is a popular Italian film magazine published in Milan, Italy. It is the most popular film magazine in Italy. The title is the Italian word (also spelled ciac, for a film clapperboard.

History and profile
Ciak was established in 1985 by Arnoldo Mondadori Editore. Each year the magazine publishes the Power List.

Ciak d'oro 
The Ciak d'oro (Golden Ciak) is an Italian annual film award. It was established in 1986 by the magazine Ciak.

It is the only award of Italian cinema that has the audience as jury: the readers of the magazine vote the best film, the best director, the best leading actors and the best foreign film of the season, instead the best supporting actors and the winners of the Ciak d'oro for technical categories and for Best Debut are designed by a jury of film critics and specialized journalists.

See also
List of magazines published in Italy

References

External links 
 Official website 

1985 establishments in Italy
Ciak
Ciak
Ciak
Ciak
Magazines published in Milan
Arnoldo Mondadori Editore